Freak is a 1998 film directed by Spike Lee. The film is a live performance of John Leguizamo's 1998 one-man show on Broadway of the same name. Leguizamo's show was semi-autobiographical as he would talk about many aspects of his life. In the performance piece, he also talks about family members such as his parents, grandparents, uncle, and his younger brother. The film premiered on HBO.

The show was a commercial and critical success and garnered Leguizamo and members of the production crew several awards and nominations. The making of this film prompted Lee to cast Leguizamo in the lead role of his next film the following year, Summer of Sam. Leguizamo followed this performance up with the Broadway show Sexaholix... A Love Story in 2001.

References

External links
 

1998 films
1998 comedy films
American biographical films
HBO Films films
American films based on plays
Films directed by Spike Lee
Television shows based on plays
Monodrama
1990s English-language films
1990s American films